Class Guitar is the thirty-third studio album by guitarist Chet Atkins. It peaked at number 26 on the Country Album charts and number 189 on the Pop Album charts. It is out of print.

Track listing

Side one
 "Yellow Bird" (Keith, Bergman, Luboff)
 "Malaguena" (Ernesto Lecuona)
 "Morenita Do Brazil" (Farrauto) – 3:02
 "Testament of Amelia"
 "Acutely Cute" (Atkins) – 2:06
 "Little Music Box" (Francisco Tárrega)
 "Lagrima" (Tárrega)

Side two
 "El Huma Hua Queno"
 "Ave Maria" (Franz Schubert) – 2:42
 "Scherzino Mexicano" (Manuel María Ponce)
 "Manha de Carnaval (Theme from "Black Orpheus")" (Bonfa, Maria) – 1:41
 "Chancion Triste" – 2:38
 "To Be in Love" (Atkins, Jerry Reed)
 "I Feel Pretty" (Leonard Bernstein, Stephen Sondheim) – 2:20

Personnel
Chet Atkins – guitar
Jim Malley – engineer

External links
 Chet Atkins Official Website Discography

1967 albums
Chet Atkins albums
Albums produced by Chet Atkins
Albums produced by Bob Ferguson (music)
RCA Victor albums